Kill on Command is the seventh studio album by American death metal band Jungle Rot. It was released by Victory Records on June 21, 2011.

Track listing

Personnel 
David Matrise: Guitar/Lead Vocals
James Genenz: Bass Guitar/Backing Vocals
Geoff Bub: Lead Guitar
Jesse Beahler: Drums
Chris "Wisco" Djuricic: Producer
Gyula Havancsak: Artwork and Design

References

2011 albums
Jungle Rot albums
Victory Records albums